Live is a live album by The Black Crowes, released on August 20, 2002.  It was produced by Rich Robinson and recorded at the Orpheum in Boston, MA on October 30 & 31, 2001 (the last two shows before the band went on hiatus for a few years).

Track listing
All songs written by Chris Robinson and Rich Robinson, except where noted.

Disc one
 "Midnight from the Inside Out" – 4:46
 "Sting Me" – 4:28
 "Thick 'n' Thin" – 3:42
 "Greasy Grass River" – 3:38
 "Sometimes Salvation" – 6:29
 "Cursed Diamond" – 6:08
 "Miracle to Me" – 6:12
 "Wiser Time" – 7:39
 "Girl from a Pawnshop" – 6:44
 "Cosmic Friend" – 5:08

Disc two
 "Black Moon Creeping" – 5:59
 "High Head Blues" – 6:11
 "Title Song" – 8:25
 "She Talks to Angels" – 6:01
 "Twice As Hard" – 4:35
 "Lickin'" – 5:14
 "Soul Singing" – 3:53
 "Hard to Handle" (Allen Jones, Alvertis Isbell, Otis Redding) – 3:26
 "Remedy" – 5:36
Japanese bonus track
"My Morning Song" - 15:55

Personnel 
The Black Crowes

 Chris Robinson – vocals
 Rich Robinson – guitar, backing vocals
 Audley Freed – guitar, backing vocals
 Steve Gorman – drums
 Eddie Harsch – keyboards, backing vocals
 Andy Hess – bass

Production

 Rich Robinson – production, mixing
 Chris Ribando – engineer, mixing
 Leon Zervos – mastering
 V2 Image Control – design
 Pete Angelus – personal management
 Mary Ellen Matthews – photography
 Butch Belair – photography

References

The Black Crowes live albums
2002 live albums
V2 Records live albums